"Heartbeat" is a song by British pop group Steps, from their debut studio album Step One (1998). Issued as a double A-side with their cover of the 1979 Bee Gees single "Tragedy", it was released on 9 November 1998 as the fourth single off the album. "Heartbeat" was solely written by Jackie James, and it was the first ballad released as a single by the group. While promoting the 2012 Hit Factory Live event, Pete Waterman revealed that the song had sat in a drawer for years before he gave it to the band to record. 

"Heartbeat" / "Tragedy" reached number one in the United Kingdom and New Zealand. In the former country, it spent 30 weeks on the UK Singles Chart and sold more copies than all three previous Steps singles combined, with 1.21 million copies sold in the UK. The music video for the song features the band trying to rescue member Ian "H" Watkins from the Ice Queen.

Music videos
The music video for "Heartbeat" were directed by David Amphlett and is set in snowy surroundings. It begins with Steps riding a sleigh while an evil Ice Queen has her sights set on Ian "H" Watkins; she is watching an image on the tiny pond in her throne room. The group are staying in a lodge, and H goes out back to fetch some wood for the fire. The Ice Queen decides that this is the time to strike, and she sends her three dwarf guards to kidnap H. They jump H, and the Ice Queen casts a spell, knocking him out. By the time H wakes up, he is in the back of their sleigh. The rest of the group come out and find H is missing, finding only a little sword carried by one of the guards. On skis and snowmobiles, they set off to rescue H. Along the way to the Ice Queen's castle, they stop at a barn, finding absolutely nothing. Arriving at the castle, they break into the throne room where H is tied up in the middle of the frozen pond. Faye Tozer, Lee Latchford-Evans and Claire Richards easily take care of the guards (while H is able to free himself), and Lisa Scott-Lee defeats the Ice Queen with a karate kick to the chin. The group then return to the lodge for a Christmas party.

Track listings
UK and Australian CD single
 "Heartbeat" – 4:24
 "Tragedy" – 4:31
 "Heartbeat" (instrumental) – 4:24

UK cassette single and European CD single
 "Heartbeat" – 4:24
 "Tragedy" – 4:31

Credits and personnel
Credits are adapted from the liner notes of Step One.

Recording
 Recorded at PWL Studios, Manchester in 1998
 Mixed at PWL Studios, Manchester
 Mastered at Transfermation Studios, London

Vocals
 Lead vocals – Claire Richards, Faye Tozer, Lisa Scott-Lee, Ian "H" Watkins
 Background vocals – Lee Latchford-Evans

Personnel
 Songwriting – Jackie James
 Production – Karl Twigg, Mark Topham, Pete Waterman
 Mixing – Pete Waterman, Dan Frampton
 Engineer – Chris McDonnell
 Drums – Chris McDonnell
 Keyboards – Karl Twigg, Mark Topham

Charts

Weekly charts

Year-end charts

Certifications

Release history

See also
 List of UK Singles Chart number ones of the 1990s
 List of million-selling singles in the United Kingdom

References

1998 songs
1998 singles
Jive Records singles
Number-one singles in New Zealand
Number-one singles in Scotland
Pete Waterman Entertainment singles
Steps (group) songs
UK Independent Singles Chart number-one singles
UK Singles Chart number-one singles